Las Brujas Airport  is a Cuban airport serving Cayo Santa María, a resort island in the municipality of Caibarién, Villa Clara Province.

Facilities

References

Airports in Cuba
Caibarién
Buildings and structures in Villa Clara Province